The Journal of Behavior Therapy and Experimental Psychiatry is a quarterly peer-reviewed scientific journal covering research on psychopathology, primarily from an experimental psychology perspective. It was established in 1970 and is published by Elsevier. Its founding editor-in-chief was Joseph Wolpe, who served as editor-in-chief from the journal's founding until his death in 1997. The current editor-in-chief is Adam S. Radomsky (Concordia University). According to the Journal Citation Reports, the journal has a 2018 impact factor of 2.189.

References

External links

Psychopathology
Psychiatry journals
Behavior therapy
Experimental psychology journals
Publications established in 1970
Quarterly journals
English-language journals
Elsevier academic journals